Mont Chauffé (2,093 m) is a mountain in the Chablais Alps in Haute-Savoie, France.

Mountains of the Alps
Mountains of Haute-Savoie
Two-thousanders of France